Who Owns the Future? a non-fiction book written by Jaron Lanier published by Simon & Schuster in 2013. The book was well received and won multiple awards in 2014: Peace Prize of the German Book Trade, the Goldsmith Book Prize, and Top honors at the San Francisco Book Festival.

Content

Lanier posits that the middle class is increasingly disenfranchised from online economies. By convincing users to give away valuable information about themselves in exchange for free services, firms can accrue large amounts of data at virtually no cost. Lanier calls these firms "Siren Servers," alluding to the Sirens of Ulysses. Instead of paying each individual for their contribution to the data pool, the Siren Servers concentrate wealth in the hands of the few who control the data centers. For example, he points to Google's translation algorithm, which amalgamates previous translations uploaded by people online, giving the user its best guess. The people behind the source translations receive no payment for their work, while Google profits from increased ad visibility as a powerful Siren Server. As a solution to this problem, Lanier puts forth an alternative structure to the web based on Ted Nelson’s Project Xanadu. He proposes a two-way linking system that would point to the source of any piece of information, creating an economy of micropayments that compensates people for original material they post to the web.

Structure 
The book is divided into nine parts plus a conclusion. Lanier ends each part of the book with interludes. Each interlude is tailored to the theme of the chapters contained in each part of the book. The interludes read like mini fictional short stories, and others suggest guiding thoughts on what reader could take away from the theme in each cluster of chapters.

Chapters 

 First Round
 The Cybernetic Tempest
 How This Century Might Unfold, from Two Points of View
 Markets, Markets, Energy Landscapes, and Narcissism
 Contest to Be Most Meta
 Democracy
 Ted Nelson
 The Dirty Pictures (or, Nuts and Bolts: What a Humanistic Alternative Might Be Like)
 Transition
 Conclusion

Reception
Joe Nocera from the New York Times said:

Janet Maslin from the New York Times compared Lanier to Michael Jackson, the "King of Pop", while dubbing Lanier "the father of virtual reality".

Hiawatha Bray from the Boston Globe said:

Peter Lawler commented:

Laurence Scott of The Guardian suggests that, though Lanier's vision of the future is intriguing, Lanier's unbridled love for Silicon Valley keeps the author from considering the negative psychological and social implications of a world saturated with data gathering, data analysis, and advertising. Nonetheless, Scott says:

The Economist commented:

The Independent said:

Columbia Journalism Review:

The Daily Telegraph said:

The Los Angeles Times noted:

The Washington Post review said:

In a somewhat critical review, Evan Hughes of The New Republic commented:

See also
 User-generated content
 Content farm
 Crowdsourcing
 Knowledge worker
 Sharing economy
 Surveillance capitalism
 Social networking websites (category)
 
 Post-scarcity economy
 The Wealth of Networks

References

External links
Official website

 
 

American non-fiction books
2013 non-fiction books
Books about the Internet
Wealth concentration
Simon & Schuster books